Hierodula timorensis is a species of praying mantis from the family Mantidae.
Found in Timor

References

timorensis
Articles created by Qbugbot
Insects described in 1842